{{Infobox song
| name       = Hangin' on a String
| cover      = Hangin on a String.jpg
| alt        =
| type       = single
| artist     = Loose Ends
| album      = So Where Are You? (also on U.S. version of A Little Spice)
| B-side     = A Little Spice
| released   = 1984 (UK) February 23, 1985 (US)
| recorded   = 1984
| studio     =
| venue      =
| genre      = 
| length     = 3:42
| label      = Virgin Records
| writer     = Carl McIntosh, Jane Eugene, Steve Nichol
| producer   = Nick Martinelli
| prev_title = Choose Me (Rescue Me)
| prev_year  = 1984
| next_title = Magic Touch
| next_year  = 1985
| misc       = 
}}

"Hangin' on a String (Contemplating)" is the seventh single by British soul band Loose Ends from their second studio album, So Where Are You?, and was released in February 1985 by Virgin Records. In the group's native UK, the single made the top twenty.
Outside the UK, the single went to number one on the U.S. Billboard R&B chart for one week. This made Loose Ends the first British band ever to top that chart   It also reached number 43 on the Billboard Hot 100.

Track listing
7” Single: VS748 
 "Hangin' on a String [Contemplating]"  3.42
 "A Little Spice"  5.08

12” Single: VS748-12
 "Hangin' on a String [Contemplating]" (Extended Dance Mix)  5.58
 "A Little Spice"  5.08

2nd 12” Single: VS748-13
 "Hangin' on a String [Contemplating]" (Extended Dance Mix)  5.58
 "Silent Talking" (feat. Tom Browne)
 "A Little Spice"  5.08

3rd 12” Single: VS748-14
 "Hangin' on a String [Contemplating]" (Mastermind Megamix)
 "Hangin' on a String [Contemplating]" (Extended Dance Mix)  5.58

3” CD Single: released 1989 "Hangin' on a String [Contemplating]" (Extended Dance Mix)  5.58
 "A Little Spice"  5.08
 "Emergency [Dial 999]" (Extended Remix)  6.42

Chart performance
{| class="wikitable"
!Chart (1985)
!Peakposition
|-
|UK Singles Chart
|align="center"|13
|-
|align="left"|U.S. Billboard Hot 100
| style="text-align:center;"|43
|-
|align="left"|U.S. Billboard Dance
| style="text-align:center;"|12
|-
|align="left"|U.S. Billboard R&B
| style="text-align:center;"|1
|-
|}

Hangin' on a String [Contemplating] 1992

"Hangin' on a String [Contemplating]" was remixed and re-released in 1992. This was a track taken from the forthcoming Loose Ends Remix project "Tighten Up Volume 1".

Track listing

7” Single: TEN406
 "Hangin' on a String [Contemplating]" (Frankie Knuckles Radio Edit)  4.20
 "Hangin' on a String [Contemplating]" (Original 7" Mix)  3.42

12” Single: TENX406
 "Hangin' on a String [Contemplating]" (Frankie Knuckles Club Mix)  6.28
 "Hangin' on a String [Contemplating]" (Original 12" Mix)  5.58
 "Hangin' on a String [Contemplating]" (The All Night Mix)  5.50
 "Johnny Broadhead" (Part 2)

CD Single: TENCD406
 "Hangin' on a String [Contemplating]" (Frankie Knuckles Radio Edit)  4.20
 "Hangin' on a String [Contemplating]" (Frankie Knuckles Club Mix)  6.28
 "Hangin' on a String [Contemplating]" (Original 12" Mix)  5.58
 "Hangin' on a String [Contemplating]" (The All Night Mix)  5.50
 "Hangin' on a String [Contemplating]" (Frankie Knuckles Classic Club Reprise)  6.08

Charts

In Popular Culture
In 2008, the song was featured on Grand Theft Auto IVs in-game radio station The Vibe 98.8.
Rapper Wiz Khalifa sampled this song for his song The Kid Frankie from the album Kush & Orange Juice, as did Big Daddy Kane for the remixed version of his 1991 hit The Lover in You
In 2022, the song was featured in the ninth episode of the third season of Atlanta.

References

External links
 Hangin' On A String (Contemplating) at Discogs.

1985 singles
Loose Ends (band) songs
Song recordings produced by Nick Martinelli
Songs written by Carl McIntosh (musician)
Songs written by Jane Eugene
Songs written by Steve Nichol
1984 songs
1985 songs
Virgin Records singles